Henry Twist (30 January 1870 – 16 May 1934) was a British miner's agent and Labour politician.

Twist was born at Platt Bridge, near Wigan, Lancashire, and after primary education at the local Wesleyan School, began employment at Bamfurlong coal mine at the age of eleven. At the age of thirty he became a checkweighman at the mine, having also been elected to the Wigan Rural District Council. In 1906 he succeeded Sam Woods as the area's agent for the Lancashire and Cheshire Miners' Federation, and was the organisation's vice-president in 1929. He subsequently served on the executive of the Miners' Federation of Great Britain.

Twist was twice elected to the House of Commons as a Labour Member of Parliament. At the January 1910 general election he became Wigan's first Labour MP. However he was defeated at the subsequent contest in December of the same year. At the 1922 general election he was returned as member for Leigh, another Lancashire coal-mining constituency. However he was forced to retire due to ill health and did not stand at the subsequent election in 1923.

Henry Twist died in Blackpool in May 1934, aged 64.

References

External links 
 

1870 births
1934 deaths
Labour Party (UK) MPs for English constituencies
Miners' Federation of Great Britain-sponsored MPs
People from Wigan
UK MPs 1910
UK MPs 1922–1923
Members of the Parliament of the United Kingdom for Leigh